The 1997 World Club Championship was an expansion of the World Club Challenge concept by Super League. The rugby competition was restructured to include all 22 clubs from the Australasian Super League and the Super League championships and was known as the Visa World Club Championship due to sponsorship. As it was contested over 6 rounds in 2 hemispheres, with A$1,000,000 prize money (GBP 640,000), the competition was prohibitively expensive to stage.  This coupled with the poor ratings and attendances that were achieved both in Australia and Europe reportedly resulted in a loss over $5,000,000, and the World Club Challenge was not staged again for a number of years. No British teams progressed further than the quarter finals, with two Australian teams reaching the final (played at the Ericsson Stadium in Auckland, New Zealand): the dominant Brisbane Broncos club and the ill-fated Hunter Mariners.

1997 tournament tables
The Australasian and European teams were each divided into two pools for the 1997 World Club Challenge. Each pool had six teams, with the exception of Australasia B, which had the two lowest placed Super League-aligned teams and the two newly formed teams: the Hunter Mariners and the Adelaide Rams. The finals series was contested between the top three teams in Australasia Pool A and Europe Pool A, and the top team from Australasia Pool B and Europe Pool B.

Australian Super League
Pool A

Pool B

Super League
Pool A

Pool B

Matches

Round 1

Round 2

Round 3

Round 4

Round 5

Round 6

Playoffs

Quarter-finals

Semi-finals

Final
In their only year of existence, this would be the only Final that the Hunter Mariners would appear in.

Teams

Match details

Aftermath
The dominance of the Australasian sides in the competition led to the Rugby Football League appointing Joe Lydon to head a commission to provide an explanation. The general conclusion was that the Australian sides were no more skillful than the European teams, the main difference as it had been in international football since the late 1970s, was fitness, something that they were working on by the time of the season ending Super League Test series between the Super League Australians and the Great Britain Lions in England in November.

See also
World Club Challenge
Super League (Australia) season 1997
Super League II
Brisbane Broncos 1997

References

External links
"Global show hits Knowsley Road" - article by Dave Hadfield at The Independent (London),  June 6, 1997
1997 World Club Challenge at hunterlink.net.au
"World Club Championship Final – Broncos' early burst" – article by Dave Hadfield at The Independent (London),  Oct 18, 1997
1997 World Club Challenge at superleague.co.uk

Brisbane Broncos
World Club Challenge
World Club Challenge
World Club Challenge
World Club Challenge
World Club Challenge